
Gmina Strzelno, Poland, is an urban-rural gmina (administrative district) in Mogilno County, Kuyavian-Pomeranian Voivodeship, in north-central Poland.

Villages
Apart from the town of Strzelno, Gmina Strzelno contains the villages and settlements of Bławatki, Bławaty, Bożejewice, Bronisław, Busewo, Ciechrz, Ciencisko, Dąbek, Górki, Jaworowo, Jeziorki, Kijewice, Książ, Kurzebiela, Łąkie, Laskowo, Markowice, Miradz, Mirosławice, Młynice, Młyny, Młyny-Wybudowanie, Niemojewko, Ostrowo, Przedbórz, Rzadkwin, Sławsko Dolne, Starczewo, Stodólno, Stodoły, Strzelno Klasztorne, Strzelno-Wybudowanie, Tomaszewo, Witkowo, Wronowy, Wymysłowice, Żegotki, Ziemowity and Zofijówka.

Neighbouring gminas
Gmina Strzelno is bordered by the gminas of Inowrocław, Janikowo, Jeziora Wielkie, Kruszwica, Mogilno, Orchowo and Wilczyn.

References
Polish official population figures 2006

Strzelno
Mogilno County